The posterior external jugular vein begins in the occipital region and returns the blood from the skin and superficial muscles in the upper and back part of the neck, lying between the Splenius and Trapezius.

It runs down the back part of the neck, and opens into the external jugular vein just below the middle of its course.

See also
 jugular vein

References 

Veins
Human head and neck